F7, F.VII, F07, F 7 or F-7 may refer to:

Aircraft
 Ambrosini F.7 Rondone II, an Italian light touring monoplane that first flew in 1954
 Caproni Vizzola F.7, an Italian fighter design of the 1940s
 Chengdu J-7, also called "F-7"
 F-7 Liberator, a U.S. reconnaissance version of the B-24 bomber
 F-7 Sea Dart, American experimental hydro-ski seaplane fighter
 F-7 Skybolt/Airguard, the export version of the Chinese Chengdu J-7 fighter
 Fokker F.VII, a 1924 Dutch airliner
 F7U Cutlass, a fighter plane used by the US Navy
 Grumman F7F Tigercat, a heavy fighter used by the US Navy

Locomotives
 EMD F7, a diesel locomotive
 LNER Class F7, a class of twelve steam locomotives transferred from the GER
 Milwaukee Road class F7, a steam locomotive

Ships
 F 7, a Kriegsmarine F-class escort ship of the late 1930s
 HMAS Yarra (F07), a 1958 Royal Australian Navy River class destroyer escort
 HMS Afridi (F07), a 1937 British Royal Navy Tribal-class destroyer
 HMS Vidette (F07), 1918 British Royal Navy V class destroyer

Other
 F 7 Såtenäs, a Swedish Air Force wing
 F7 (video game character), a Street Fighter character
 IHI Corporation F7, a small Japanese turbofan
 Flybaboo, IATA airline designator
 A standard white point for narrow band daylight fluorescent lamps
 F7, a note of high altitude in the seventh octave and the whistle register
 Factor VII, a coagulation factor
 F7 (classification), a wheelchair sport classification that corresponds to the neurological level S1-S2
 A function key on a computer keyboard
 F-7, Islamabad, a residential sector in Islamabad, Pakistan
 Double Bay ferry services, a ferry route in Sydney 
 F7: an EEG electrode site according to the 10-20 system.
Furious 7, colloquially known as F7, 2015 film